The East Gallatin River flows  in a northwesterly direction through the Gallatin valley, Gallatin County, Montana. Rising from the confluence of Rocky Creek and several other small streams, the East Gallatin begins about one mile (1.6 km) east of downtown Bozeman, Montana.

Angling the East Gallatin
The East Gallatin river is a popular trout fishing stream and holds good populations of rainbow and brown trout as well as mountain whitefish.  Access is limited to country road crossings and two public assess sites maintained by the Montana Fish, Wildlife and Parks department. Numerous spring creeks, most notably Ben Hart and Thompson, feed the East Gallatin throughout its course and provide excellent trout fishing as well.

See also

List of rivers of Montana
Montana Stream Access Law
Fly fishing

References

Notes

Rivers of Montana
Rivers of Gallatin County, Montana